KB Ylli, known as Golden Eagle Ylli for sponsorship reasons, is a professional basketball club based in Suva Reka, Kosovo. The club currently plays in the Kosovo Basketball Superleague. Its fan club is called Xhebrailat  The 2015–16 season was the second consecutive in the Kosovo Superleague. In the 2014–15 season, they finished fourth and played in playoff finals against Sigal Prishtina.

History 
KB Ylli is one of the oldest clubs in Kosovo. It was founded in 1975. The club is known for its fans who support their club in especially in home games at 13 Qërshori sports hall. Their home matches are known for the fantastic atmosphere created by "Xherbrailat". Ylli means "star" in English.

In the 2018-19 season of Kosovo Basketball Superleague they finished second and lost the semi-finals of the play off against KB Rahoveci. In the 2019-20 season they lost the final of Kosovan Cup against KB Peja.
In 2008 the club decided to withdraw from Kosovo Superleague due to bad financial conditions, and didn't play until 2014 when Golden Eagle, a beverage company from Suhareka, decided to be the main sponsor of the team and to pay for Wild Card which returned KB Ylli in Kosovo Superleague.

Honours
Kosovo Basketball Superleague:
Winners (2): 2020–21, 2021–22
Runners Up (1) 1994–95

Kosovo Cup:
Runners-up (2): 2019–20, 2020–21

Liga Unike:
Winners (1): 2020–21
Runners Up(1): 2021-22

Liga Unike Supercup
Winners (1): 2021

Arena 
The club currently plays in the sport center Palestra 13 Qershori, in the center of Theranda, with a capacity for around 1300 spectators.

Matches in European competitions

Current roster

Depth chart

References

External links
 EuroBasket.com

Sport in Suva Reka
Basketball teams established in 1975
Basketball teams in Yugoslavia
Basketball teams in Kosovo
1975 establishments in Yugoslavia